The Sheoraphuli Raj Debuttar Estate was a part of the Zamindari of the Sheoraphuli Raj Parivar.

History 
Sheoraphuli fell under the Zamindari of Raja Manohar Roy, a Raja in Bengal during the reign of Akbar the Great of the Mughal era. Raja Raj Chandra Roy, also known as Jotey Raja (the king with dreadlocks), Zamindar of Sheoraphuli built the temple of Ram-Sita at Sripur (Serampore) in 1752. He resided in the Rajbari of Sheoraphuli built by him, which also served as his temporary residence apart from his abode in Patuli. His third son Raja Harischandra left Patuli for Sheoraphuli, which served as their permanent dwelling thereafter. After him the Zamindari was demarcated into the 'Barataraf' and the 'Chototaraf' which has been retained. 

Later on Zamindar Nirmal Chandra Ghosh (Barataraf) and his descendants of the Raj Parivar continue to reside in the Rajbari. The Saraphuli Raj Debuttar has been traditionally renowned for the policy of self-effacement.

Culture 
The Sarvamangala Devi Temple of the Raj Debuttar Estate is a center of attraction in and around the area most notably during the occasion of Durga Puja. Devotees and bhakts from various places gather for the 'Arati'. The Puja is also a special occasion for gatherings of family members of the Raj Parivar. The "Kumari Puja" during the 'Mahaashtami' is a special and prominent phase during the Rajbari Durga Puja. The temple is also an abode for the Govindahari-Radhika murti and the family deities Shree Shree Lakshmi Janardan Thakur. 
 
The Rajbari Durga Puja reached its 280th year in 2012. The Asthadhaatu murti of Devi Sarvamangala is said to have been excavated from below ground, after a vision appeared before Raja Manohar Roy. The temple and the Durga Puja has a rich history and is looked after by the Raj Debuttar Trust. The trust was formed by the members of the Raj Parivar to ensure timely temple renovations and maintenance.

References 

Zamindari estates
Hooghly district